Alejandro "Álex" Domínguez Romero (born 30 July 1999) is a Spanish footballer who plays as a goalkeeper for UD Las Palmas.

Club career
Born in Granollers, Barcelona, Catalonia, Domínguez represented CE Sabadell FC as a youth before making his senior debut with the reserves on 6 December 2014, starting in a 1–2 Tercera División home loss against UE Castelldefels. After one further match for the B-side, he moved to RCD Espanyol and was assigned back to the youth setup.

In 2016, Domínguez was loaned to CF Damm for one year, to finish his formation; upon returning, he was assigned to Espanyol's B-team also in the fourth division. He featured sparingly for the side, and renewed his contract until 2020 on 22 March 2018.

On 10 July 2018, after achieving promotion, Domínguez agreed to a three-year deal with another reserve team, Deportivo Alavés B still in division four. On 28 August of the following year, after another promotion, he moved to UD Las Palmas and was initially assigned to the B-side in the Segunda División B.

Domínguez made his first team debut on 20 July 2020, starting in a 5–1 home routing of Extremadura UD in the Segunda División. He began the 2020–21 campaign as a backup to Álvaro Valles, but was made a starter by manager Pepe Mel in November after a poor run of form from Valles.

On 27 July 2021, after losing his starting spot back to Valles, Domínguez was loaned to second division newcomers UD Ibiza for a year.

References

External links
 
 
 

1998 births
Living people
Footballers from Granollers
Spanish footballers
Association football goalkeepers
Segunda División players
Segunda División B players
Tercera División players
CE Sabadell FC B players
CF Damm players
RCD Espanyol B footballers
Deportivo Alavés B players
UD Las Palmas Atlético players
UD Las Palmas players
UD Ibiza players